Gundheim is an Ortsgemeinde – a municipality belonging to a Verbandsgemeinde, a kind of collective municipality – in the Alzey-Worms district in Rhineland-Palatinate, Germany.

Geography

Location 
The municipality lies in Rhenish Hesse and is a winegrowing centre. It belongs to the Verbandsgemeinde of Wonnegau, whose seat is in Osthofen.

History 
In 774, Gundheim had its first documentary mention in a document from Lorsch Abbey.

Politics

Municipal council 
The council is made up of 12 council members, who were elected at the municipal election held on 7 June 2009, and the honorary mayor as chairman.

The municipal election held on 7 June 2009 yielded the following results:

Coat of arms 
The municipality's arms might be described thus: Azure a talon Or barwise unguled gules, issuant from the top three plumes argent.

What appears on the escutcheon is a canting charge for the noble family that was enfeoffed with Gundheim in 1699. It bore the name Greiffenclau, rather reminiscent of the German words greifen (“grasp” or “seize”) and Klaue (“claw”).

Wineries 
Well known Gundheim wineries in the Bergkloster winemaking appellation – Weingroßlage – in the Wonnegau are:
 Hungerbien
 Mandelbrunnen
 Sonnenberg

References

External links 
 Municipality’s official webpage 

Alzey-Worms